is a series of cliffs on the Sea of Japan in Japan. It is located in the Antō part of Mikuni-chō in Sakai, Fukui Prefecture. The area is part of the Echizen-Kaga Kaigan Quasi-National Park.

Formation
The cliffs' rocks were originally formed 12 to 13 million years ago during the Miocene Epoch due to various volcanic activities, and were created by magma mixing with sedimentary rock to form columnar joints of pyroxene andesite containing Plagioclase crystals, Augite and Enstatite crystals in pentagonal or hexagonal shapes, which has been eroded by the sea. The area received protection by the national government in 1935 as a Natural Monument.

Legends
His ghost is still said to haunt the area.

An alternate legend says that the name Tōjinbō comes from a dissolute Buddhist monk. According to the legend, a Buddhist monk named Tōjinbō, who was disliked by everyone, fell in love with a beautiful princess named Aya. Tōjinbō was tricked by another admirer of Princess Aya and was pushed off these cliffs. The legend says that ever after that time Tōjinbō's vengeful ghost would go on a rampage around the same time every year at this place, causing strong winds and rain. Some decades later, an itinerant priest took pity on Tōjinbō and held a memorial service for him. After that, the storms ceased.

Suicides

Tōjinbō is also a well-known place in Japan to commit suicide. In the 2000s, Yukio Shige, a retired police officer, frustrated at having had to fish so many bodies out of the sea and the inaction of local authorities, began patrolling the cliffs for potential jumpers.

Although 14 people committed suicide there in 2016, in 2017, there had been no suicides for months. Yukio Shige says it is partly because many people come there to catch rare creatures in the mobile phone game Pokémon Go.

References

IUCN Category IV
Landforms of Fukui Prefecture
Places of Scenic Beauty
Natural monuments of Japan
Cliffs of Asia
Landforms of Japan
Tourist attractions in Fukui Prefecture
Rock formations of Japan
Coasts of Japan
Volcanism of Japan
Miocene volcanism
Sakai, Fukui